Nikola Tsanev (11 December 1939 – 7 October 2004) was a Bulgarian footballer, who played as a forward. He played for Bulgaria in 8 matches, scoring 3 goals. He also competed in the men's tournament at the 1960 Summer Olympics.

Career
Tsanev started his career with Levski Sofia, but is mainly remembered for his highly successful career with CSKA Sofia during the 60s. With CSKA, he won the A Group title six times and the Bulgarian Cup three times. During the 1963–64 season, he scored 26 league goals to become A Group top goalscorer.

References

1939 births
2004 deaths
Bulgarian footballers
Bulgaria international footballers
PFC Levski Sofia players
PFC CSKA Sofia players
First Professional Football League (Bulgaria) players
Footballers from Sofia
Association football forwards
Olympic footballers of Bulgaria
Footballers at the 1960 Summer Olympics